St. Luke's Episcopal Church is an historic Carpenter Gothic–style Episcopal church building located at 219 Chunn's Cove Road, in the Chunn's Cove neighborhood of Asheville, North Carolina. Built in 1894 at a cost of $728, St. Luke's was designed by E. J. Armstrong, a member of the congregation. The first service was held on September 17, 1894.

On September 30, 1997, St. Luke's was added to the National Register of Historic Places.

History 

In 1847, the Reverend Jarvis Buxton came to Asheville, then a community of about 800 people, to become the Rector of Trinity Church. A missionary-minded priest, the Rev. Buxton was responsible for beginning the work of the Episcopal Church in Chunns Cove, Beaverdam, West Asheville and Waynesville. St. Luke's Episcopal Church was designed by E. J. Armstrong, a member of the congregation, and built in 1894, at a cost of $728. The first service was held on September 17, 1894.

In the 1940s, the Reverend James B. Sill obtained two (or possibly three) stained–glass panels, or "lights," that once been installed in St. Chrysostom's Chapel in New York City. (The chapel, built and maintained by New York City's Trinity Chapel, had been demolished in 1929 because it had sustained structural damage from a nearby subway.) The distinctive style of the stained glass leads this researcher to conclude that the glass was designed and manufactured in the late 19th century by Heaton, Butler and Bayne of London. One of the lights is installed in St. Luke's but another is broken—perhaps during the journey to western North Carolina—and is being stored at the church.

From an item published in the Asheville Citizen, dated January 11, 1942:

The original deed for the land was professionally restored by licensed archivists in 2013, and that document now hangs in the climate-controlled parish house. A framed color facsimile hangs in the nave of the church, because that building is subject to greater temperature fluctuations.

Present day 
St. Luke's is a small but active parish in the Episcopal Diocese of Western North Carolina. The Rev. Patty Mouer has been the rector since December 4, 2004.

Holy Eucharist services are held at 8:00 am and 10:30 am; studies and classes begin at 9:00 am; and a coffee hour follows the later Sunday service. A healing service is held on Wednesdays at 12:15 pm. Special services for church holy days are also held throughout the year, most notably during Lent, the Easter Season, the Christmas Season and others, as noted on the church website and its Facebook page. The parish house is located just north of the church, where adult education classes and children's bible studies are held; the rector's offices are also there.

In keeping with the Episcopal Diocese of Western North Carolina's commitment to social justice, St. Luke's parishioners serve the larger community in many ways. (Note: The Episcopal Diocese of Western North Carolina has historically practiced a higher churchmanship than most dioceses in the Fourth Province, and especially the other two dioceses in the state.) St. Luke's allows the use of its parish-house basement for more than one dozen 12-Step recovery meetings per week, though these meetings are strictly independent and have no affiliation with or endorsement from the church.

Stewardship 

One boundary of the church property lies along Ross Creek, a tributary to the French Broad River. Since the late 2000s, parishioners have been removing invasive plants (mainly kudzu) from the creek's banks. In 2012, the church partnered with RiverLink  to install native plants that help filter pollutants from rainwater as it runs off roofs and roadways on its way to Ross Creek. An info kiosk, installed by a local Scout troop, describes the project and recognizes St. Luke's involvement of other eco-partnerships.

Today, the ongoing work to keep back the kudzu, its environmentally friendly plantings, and low-impact artificial lighting (despite significant development in East Asheville over the last few decades) has earned St. Luke's the honor of being certified in the North Carolina Wildlife Federation's F.A.I.T.H. program (Fellowship Actions Impacting The Habitat). The NCWF "recognizes and certifies places of worship of all denominations that meet the requirements for a wildlife–friendly habitat. The certification celebrates the beauty and importance of nature and focuses on shared responsibility of wildlife stewardship." Black bears and wild turkeys are sometimes seen along the western boundary, heading to or from Ross Creek.

Cemetery and labyrinth 
A consecrated cemetery and the Garden of the Resurrection, a cremains burial area, lie just west of the church, near the western property boundary. Simple carved gravestones, cut from local stone, date from the mid–19th century to the present day.

A low-profile labyrinth, outlined in smooth river stones, was installed on the grounds in 2014.

References

External links 
 
 
 Fellowship Actions Impacting the Habitat (FAITH)
 

Episcopal church buildings in North Carolina
Churches on the National Register of Historic Places in North Carolina
Carpenter Gothic church buildings in North Carolina
Churches in Asheville, North Carolina
Churches completed in 1894
19th-century Episcopal church buildings
National Register of Historic Places in Buncombe County, North Carolina